Eudromus is a genus of beetles in the family Carabidae, containing the following species:

 Eudromus ankavandrae Tschitscherine, 1900
 Eudromus bastardi Alluaud, 1932
 Eudromus imerinae Alluaud, 1932
 Eudromus perrieri Fairmaire, 1903
 Eudromus striaticollis (Brulle, 1834)

References

Pterostichinae